Meftah is a town and commune in Blida Province, Algeria. According to the 2008 census it has a population of 40,878.

Notable people
 Djamel Bouaïcha - professional footballer
 Noureddine Drioueche - professional footballer
 Abdelmalek Droukdel - Islamic militant
 Yahia Boushaki (Shahid) - militant and shahid
 Zoubir Zmit - professional footballer

References

Communes of Blida Province
Algeria
Cities in Algeria